Lucius William O'Brien, 15th Baron Inchiquin (21 June 1864 – 9 December 1929) was the England-born holder of a hereditary peerage in the Peerage of Ireland, as well as Chief of the Name of O'Brien and Prince of Thomond in the Gaelic Irish nobility.

Early life
O'Brien was born in England the second of four children, and oldest son, to Edward O'Brien, 14th Baron Inchiquin and first wife Emily A'Court, at Belmore near Bishop's Waltham, Hampshire. He was educated at Eton College.

Career 
O'Brien was commissioned into the Royal Irish Rifles in 1885, transferring in 1886 to the English Rifle Brigade regiment in which he served until 1893. He was later Honorary Colonel of the Clare Royal Field Artillery Reserve Volunteers.

Politically a Conservative, O'Brien unsuccessfully stood for the British House of Commons by contesting the Eastern Division of County Clare in 1885. He was State Steward to the Lord Lieutenant of Ireland in 1895. He succeeded his father's peerage in 1900, serving hence as an Irish Representative Peer in the House of Lords. In 1921 he was appointed to the Senate of Southern Ireland which was abolished the next year by the formation of the Irish Free State.

He was Deputy Lieutenant and Justice of the Peace for County Clare, of which county he was High Sheriff for 1898. He was also a Justice of the Peace for the county of Salop, Shropshire.

Family
On 14 January 1896, Inchiquin married, at Richard's Castle, Ethel Jane Foster, daughter of Johnston Jonas Foster, of Moor Park near Ludlow, Shropshire, which became his English residence. Together they had six children:

 Donough Edward Foster O'Brien, 16th Baron Inchiquin (born 5 January 1897, died 19 October 1968)
 Hon Katharine Beryl O'Brien (born 19 April 1898)
 Phaedrig Lucius Ambrose O'Brien, 17th Baron Inchiquin (born 4 April 1900, died 1982)
 Hon Fionn Myles Maryons O'Brien (born 28 October 1903, died 2 August 1977), father of Conor Myles John O'Brien, 18th Baron Inchiquin
 Hon Griselda Etheldreda Clodagh O'Brien (born 19 October 1906)
 Hon Finola Helga Laetitia Monica O'Brien (born 22 September 1910, died 1975)

Lord Inchiquin died on 9 December 1929, aged sixty-five, and was succeeded by two of his sons as barons.

Ancestry

References

Book cited

1864 births
1929 deaths
People educated at Eton College
19th-century Irish people
Lucius
People from County Clare
Irish representative peers
Members of the Senate of Southern Ireland
Deputy Lieutenants of County Clare
High Sheriffs of Clare
Barons Inchiquin
Irish chiefs of the name